Streptomyces thermocoprophilus is a thermophilic  bacterium species from the genus of Streptomyces which has been isolated from poultry faeces in Malaysia.

See also 
 List of Streptomyces species

References

Further reading

External links
Type strain of Streptomyces thermocoprophilus at BacDive -  the Bacterial Diversity Metadatabase

thermocoprophilus
Bacteria described in 2000